Célia de Lavergne (born 21 November 1979) is a French politician of La République En Marche! (LREM) who was elected to the French National Assembly on 18 June 2017, representing the 3rd constituency of the department of Drôme.

Early career
De Lavergne led the Scientific and Technical Association for Water and the Environment (ASTEE) from 2011 until 2014. From 2014 until 2016, she worked as advisor on sustainable development and the smart city to Deputy Mayor of Paris Jean-Louis Missika, in the city government led by Mayor Anne Hidalgo.

Political career
In parliament, de Lavergne has been serving as member of the Committee on Economic Affairs since 2017. From 2018 until 2019, she was her parliamentary group's coordinator on the committee. From 2019 until 2020, she was also a member of the Committee on Sustainable Development and Spatial Planning. She is the parliament's rapporteur on the roll-out of fiber-optic communication in France.

In addition, de Lavergne is part of the French Parliamentary Friendship Group with São Tomé and Príncipe.

She lost her seat in the 2022 French legislative election.

Political positions
In July 2019, de Lavergne voted in favor of the French ratification of the European Union’s Comprehensive Economic and Trade Agreement (CETA) with Canada.

See also
 2017 French legislative election

References

1979 births
Living people
Deputies of the 15th National Assembly of the French Fifth Republic
La République En Marche! politicians
21st-century French women politicians
People from Clamart
Women members of the National Assembly (France)
École Polytechnique alumni
École des Ponts ParisTech alumni